The Botanischer Garten der Christian-Albrechts-Universität zu Kiel (8 hectares), or less formally the Botanischer Garten Kiel, is a botanical garden and arboretum maintained by the University of Kiel. It is located at Am Botanischen Garten 1, Kiel, Schleswig-Holstein, Germany, and open daily.

History 
Kiel has had various botanical gardens since 1668, when professor Johann Daniel Major (1634-1693) established his horticus medicus within the garden of Kiel Castle. It is unclear whether this garden survived the Danish occupation of 1675-1676. Subsequent gardens were established the site of the former Franciscan monastery on the Falckstraße (from 1727) and the garden at the Prüne (from 1803). Kiel's Alter Botanischer Garten (Old Botanical Garden), which still exists, began in 1825 as a private park, was acquired by the University of Kiel in 1868, and from 1878-1884 was refashioned by botanist Adolf Engler as a botanical garden. It ultimately proved too small, and from 1975-1978 the university created a new botanical garden on its campus, which opened to the public in 1985.

Collection 
Today this newer garden contains 14,000 plant species in a variety of outdoor settings and greenhouses. Outdoor areas include an arboretum with tree collections from Asia, America, and Europe; heath and moor; dune habitat; systematic garden; rose garden; alpine garden; and a pond and southern landscape. Seven major exhibition greenhouses (total area 3,000 m²) contain plants from the tropics, subtropics, forests, Mediterranean, deserts of Africa and American, and tropical aquatic regions.

The garden maintains a focus on indigenous plants of Schleswig-Holstein within a broader representation of plants from around the world, including special collections of South African succulents and plants from the Atlantic islands, as well as Adromischus, Aizoaceae, Aristolochia, Campanulaceae, Crassulaceae, Cuscuta, Passiflora, Plumbaginaceae, and Vitaceae. Its herbarium contains about 120,000 specimens of all plant families, with good collections of algae, lichens, fungi, slime mold, mosses, and ferns.

See also 
 Alter Botanischer Garten Kiel
 List of botanical gardens in Germany

References 
 Botanischer Garten der Christian-Albrechts-Universität zu Kiel
 BGCI entry
 Hermann von Helmholtz-Zentrum
 Bihrmann photographs
 Movie of the garden
 Richter, Joachim, "Botanischer Garten der Christian-Albrechts-Universität Kiel", in Botanische Gärten Mitteleuropas: Geschichte, technische Einrichtungen, Anlagen, Sammlungen und Aufgaben, Friedrich  Ebel et al. (eds), Wissenschaftliche Beiträge der Martin-Luther-Universität Halle Wittenberg, Band 27, Halle, pages 225-227, 1990. 
 "Kiel: Botanischer Garten der Universität", in Die botanischen Gärten in Deutschland, Loki  Schmidt (ed.), Hamburg : Hoffmann und Campe, pages 183-187, 1997.
 Uhlarz, Helmut; Müller, Klaus; Richter, Joachim, Führer durch den neuen Botanischen Garten Kiel, Botanisches Institut und Botanischer Garten der Christian-Albrechts-Universität, 1991.
 Uhlarz, Helmut, Festschrift zum 20-jährigen Bestehen des Neuen Botanischen Gartens der Christian-Albrechts-Universität zu Kiel und zum 10. Skulpturensommer (6. Juni 1985 - 6. Juni 2005), Neumünster : Wachholtz, 2005.

Kiel, Botanischer Garten der Christian-Albrechts-Universitat zu
Kiel, Botanischer Garten der Christian-Albrechts-Universitat zu